Dimitri Khundadze (born 1968) is a Georgian physician and politician.

Early life and education 
Dimitri Khundadze was born on 30 November 1968, in Mtskheta of the Georgian SSR, which was then a part of the Soviet Union. He was in compulsory military service from 1987 to 1989, and graduated from the Paediatric Faculty of the Tbilisi Medical Academy (TMA) in 1996. He was then a post-graduate student at TMA until 1998.

Career

Medical 
From 2001 to 2012, Khundadze worked as a doctor at S. Khechinashvili University Hospital.

Political 
Khundadze was previously a member of the Georgian Dream, a pro-European political party in Georgia. In 2012, Khundadze was elected a member of the Georgian Parliament of the 8th convocation, winning from Mtskheta during the Georgian parliamentary election. He was reelected in the 2016 Georgian parliamentary election and the 2020 Georgian parliamentary election. On 2 August 2022, Khundadze left the Georgian Dream party and co-founded the People's Power party.

References 

1968 births
Living people
Politicians from Georgia (country)
Members of the Parliament of Georgia
Georgian Dream politicians
People from Mtskheta